Lianne Rood  (born ) is a Canadian politician, who was elected to represent the riding of Lambton—Kent—Middlesex in the House of Commons of Canada in the 2019 Canadian federal election.

Electoral record

References

External links
 

Living people
1970s births
Conservative Party of Canada MPs
Members of the House of Commons of Canada from Ontario
Women members of the House of Commons of Canada
Farmers from Ontario
Canadian women farmers
21st-century Canadian politicians
21st-century Canadian women politicians
People from Lambton County